Shadowland was an American monthly magazine about art, dance, and film published from 1919 to 1923 before being absorbed by Motion Picture Classic. The first issue appeared in September 1919. The subtitle was "the Handsomest Magazine in the Whole World". The publisher was M. P. Publishing Company and the headquarters was in New York City. It featured art deco illustrations, caricatures, photographs, poetry, and articles concerning artists, actors, dancers, the theatre, and music. Its covers were designed by A. M. Hopfmuller. The last issue was published in November 1923.

References

External links

Visual arts magazines published in the United States
Monthly magazines published in the United States
Defunct magazines published in the United States
Magazines disestablished in 1923
Magazines established in 1919
Magazines published in New York City